Ludwig Yehuda Wolpert (Yehuda Wolpert), (7 October 1900 - 6 November 1981) was an Israeli-American goldsmith and designer, born in Germany.  He is celebrated as the first artist to design Judaica in modern styles.

Biography

Ludwig Yehuda Wolpert was born in Hildesheim, Germany, to a poor Orthodox family. During his childhood he suffered as a result of his family's Lithuanian Jewish (immigrant) origin and was often teased because of his cleft lip. In 1916-1920, he began his studies in sculpture at the Frankfurt School of Art. In 1925-1928, he studied goldsmithing at the Frankfurt School of Art.

Art career
Following the presentation of the works in the 1930 exhibition "Kult und Form" ("Ritual and form") at the Jewish Museum in Berlin, his works became well known in the German Jewish world. His works were greatly influenced by Modernist design, especially the Bauhaus movement. Wolpert's works avoid decoration, relying on clean, geometric shapes. In 1933, following the Nazi rise to power in Germany, he immigrated to the Land of Israel with his family. There, he worked in the B. Friedland Workshop where he designed and manufactured silver tableware and Jewish ceremonial art. Together with Victor Solomon Reese] he made the sculpture "The Flying Camel", the symbol of the "Levant Fair", under the architect Aryeh Elhanani.

Teaching career
In 1935 he began teaching at Bezalel Academy of Arts and Design in Jerusalem, where he headed the Department of Metal together with jeweler David Heinz Gumbel. Wolpert placed an emphasis on the use of Hebrew calligraphy in Jewish ceremonial art. In addition to his teaching, he continued to create modern Judaica at the school’s workshop. In 1942 he established an independent workshop in Jerusalem. 

In 1956, Wolpert moved to the  United States, where he headed the Tobe Pascher Workshop for Modern Jewish Art at the Jewish Museum in New York City.

Awards and recognition 

Early 1950s, Nehushtan Company Prize, The Bezalel National Museum, Jerusalem
1976 Honorary Doctorate of Hebrew Letters from the Spertus Institute for Jewish Learning and Leadership, Chicago

Exhibitions
1933  "Kult und Form", Jewish Museum of Berlin, Germany
1939  The Judaica Pavilion, New York World's Fair, New York
1953  One-man exhibition, Bezalel Museum, Jerusalem
1957  Retrospective exhibition, Jewish Museum of New York
1976  Retrospective exhibition, Jewish Museum of New York
1976  Retrospective exhibition,  Spertus Institute for Jewish Learning and Leadership, Chicago
1977  "Wolpert: A Retrospective", The Hebrew Union College Skirball Museum, L.A.
2012 "Forging Ahead: Wolpert and Gumbel, Israeli Silversmiths for the Modern Age", Israel Museum, Jerusalem

References

Further reading
Sharon Weiser-Ferguson, Forging Ahead: Wolpert and Gumbel, Israeli Silversmiths for the Modern Age, Israel Museum, Jerusalem, 2012

External links
 
 Forging Ahead: Wolpert and Gumbel, Israeli Silversmiths for the Modern Age, The Israel Museum Web site
 Guide to the Papers of Ludwig Yehuda Wolpert (1900-1981) at the Yeshiva University Museum, New York.

Israeli designers
1900 births
1981 deaths
Academic staff of Bezalel Academy of Arts and Design
German emigrants to Mandatory Palestine
Israeli emigrants to the United States